The 2018 Dunlop MSA British Touring Car Championship (commonly abbreviated as BTCC) was a motor racing championship for production-based touring cars held across England and Scotland. It was sponsored by Dunlop. The championship featured a mix of professional motor racing teams and privately funded amateur drivers competing in highly modified versions of family cars which were sold to the general public and conform to the technical regulations for the championship. The 2018 season was the 61st British Touring Car Championship season and the eighth season for cars conforming to the Next Generation Touring Car (NGTC) technical specification. The 2018 season also marked the 60th anniversary since the series’ introduction.

The thirty races held during the season saw seventeen different drivers win a race, setting a new championship record. Six drivers won their first race, but Jason Plato went through a season without winning a race for the first time since his debut in 1997. Colin Turkington claimed his third BTCC title and his first since 2014.

Teams and drivers
All teams and drivers competed under British racing licenses.

Driver changes 
Changed teams
Matt Simpson moved from Halford Yuasa Racing to Eurotech Racing.
Tom Chilton moved from Power Maxed Racing to Motorbase Performance.
Josh Cook moved from Triple Eight Racing back to Power Maxed Racing.
James Cole moved from Team BMR to Motorbase Performance.
Rory Butcher moved from Motorbase Performance to AmDTuning.com.
Entering/re-entering BTCC
2017 VW Cup champion Bobby Thompson will make his series début, with Team HARD.
2014 & 2017 Renault UK Clio Cup champion Mike Bushell will return to the series with Team HARD, having last raced in the championship in 2015.
Michael Caine will return to series with Team HARD Brisky Racing, having last raced with the team in 2016.
2017 British F4 driver Sam Smelt will make his debut in the series with AmDTuning.com.
2015 Ginetta GT4 Supercup champion Tom Oliphant will make his series debut, with Ciceley Motorsport.
2016 runner-up Sam Tordoff returned to the series after a year racing in the British GT Championship, driving a third car for Motorbase Performance under the GardX Racing banner.
2015–16 Porsche Carrera Cup Great Britain champion Dan Cammish, will make his debut in the series with Halfords Yuasa Racing.
Former race winner Tom Boardman will return to the series with AmDTuning.com, having last raced in 2011.

Leaving BTCC
Árón Taylor-Smith announced on 27 November 2017 that he would be stepping away from the series to pursue a career in GT Racing.
Dave Newsham announced on 9 January 2018 that he would retire from the BTCC to focus on his sons racing.
Gordon Shedden announced on 22 January 2018 that he would be leaving the BTCC, eventually joining Team WRT to race in the World Touring Car Cup.
Mat Jackson left the series after splitting with Motorbase Performance and failing to secure a vacant seat with another team.
Stewart Lines and Maximum Motorsport left the series, having sold their car and TBL to Ciceley Motorsport.
Michael Epps will leave the series and join the 2018 Renault UK Clio Cup.
Jeff Smith will miss the 2018 season as he continues to recover from injuries sustained in his 2017 crash.
Ant Whorton-Eales left AmDTuning.com and switched to the Mini Challenge UK driving for JamSport.
Unable to secure drives, Will Burns and Martin Depper both left the series.

Team changes 
Handy Motorsport will change its name to HMS Racing and also switch to running the Alfa Romeo Giulietta, having run the Toyota Avensis, since their début in 2014.
Team HARD will expand from a three-car to a four-car squad.
Eurotech Racing will expand from a two-car to a three-car squad.
BTC Norlin Racing will switch from running the Chevrolet Cruze to run the Honda Civic Type R (FK2).
Motorbase Performance will switch from running the Ford Focus ST to run the Ford Focus RS.
AmDTuning.com will expand from a two-car to a four-car squad, after having agreed a deal to run the MG6 GTs, which were previously run by Triple Eight Racing.
Team Dynamics will switch from running the Honda Civic Type R (FK2) to run the newer Honda Civic Type R (FK8).
 For the first time since 1996, Triple Eight Racing did not field a racing team in the BTCC. The MG6 GT race cars were acquired by AmD. Triple Eight was one of the most successful teams to race in the BTCC, firstly fielding the works Vauxhall team from 1997-2009 in which time the team achieved eight manufacturer titles for Vauxhall (2001-05, 2007-09) and a further title with MG in 2014. The team also won the drivers championship in 2001-04, 2007-08. The team officially folded in November 2018.

Race calendar

The championship calendar was announced by the championship organisers on 26 May 2017. All the circuits from the 2017 season will host rounds again with the only change being the rounds at Rockingham Motor Speedway and Knockhill Racing Circuit switching places. In October 2017, the BTCC bosses announced that Snetterton Motor Racing Circuit will play host to a special extended race this season as part of the series’ 60th anniversary celebrations.

Results

Championship standings

Notes
No driver may collect more than one point for leading a lap per race regardless of how many laps they lead.
A special 60 mile race 3 at Snetterton with standalone qualifying, no ballast and double points

Drivers' Championship
(key)

Manufacturers' Championship
(key)

Teams' Championship
(key)

Independents Drivers' Trophy

Independent Teams' Trophy

Jack Sears Trophy

Notes

References

External links

TouringCarTimes

British Touring Car Championship seasons
Touring Car Championship